South Dakota v. Dole, 483 U.S. 203 (1987), was a case in which the United States Supreme Court considered the limitations that the Constitution places on the authority of the United States Congress when Congress uses its authority to influence the individual states in areas of authority normally reserved to the states. The Court upheld the constitutionality of a federal statute that withheld federal funds from states whose legal drinking age did not conform to federal policy.

Background
In 1984, the United States Congress passed the National Minimum Drinking Age Act, which withheld a percentage – 5% in the first year the law was in effect, 10% thereafter – of federal highway funding from states that did not maintain a minimum legal drinking age of 21. South Dakota, which allowed 19-year-olds to purchase (raised from 18 years old as result of NMDAA) beer containing up to 3.2% alcohol, challenged the law, naming Secretary of Transportation Elizabeth Dole as the defendant.

Decision
The Supreme Court held 7–2 that the statute represented a valid use of Congressional authority under the Spending Clause and that the statute did not infringe upon the rights of the states. The Court established a five-point rule for considering the constitutionality of expenditure cuts of this type:

 The spending must promote "the general welfare."
 The condition must be unambiguous.
 The condition should relate "to the federal interest in particular national projects or programs."
 The condition imposed on the states must not, in itself, be unconstitutional.
 The condition must not be coercive.

Writing for the majority, Chief Justice William Rehnquist noted that the National Minimum Drinking Age Act clearly met the first three restrictions, leaving only the latter two restrictions worthy of consideration. Rehnquist wrote that the Congress did not violate the Tenth Amendment because it merely exercised its right to control federal spending. Rehnquist wrote that the Congress did not coerce the states, because it cut only a small percentage of federal funding. Congress thus applied pressure, but not irresistible pressure.

Dissent
Justices O'Connor and Brennan filed dissents. O'Connor agreed that Congress may attach conditions on the receipt of federal funds, and that the Twenty-First Amendment gives states authority over laws relating to the consumption of alcohol. However, she wrote that the attachment of condition on the states must be "reasonably related to the expenditure of funds." She disagreed with the Court's conclusion that withholding federal highway funds was reasonably related to deterring drunken driving and drinking by minors and young adults. She argued that the condition was both overinclusive and underinclusive: it prevented teenagers from drinking when they are not going to drive on federal and federally funded highways, and it did not attempt to remedy the overall problem of drunken driving on federal and federally funded highways. She viewed the relation between the condition and spending as being too attenuated: "establishment of a minimum drinking age of 21 is not sufficiently related to interstate highway construction to justify so conditioning funds appropriated for that purpose."

See also
U.S. history of alcohol minimum purchase age by state
List of United States Supreme Court cases
 Gonzales v. Raich (2005)
 National Federation of Independent Business v. Sebelius (2012)

Notes

Further reading

External links
 
 

United States Constitution Article One case law
United States Supreme Court cases
United States Supreme Court cases of the Rehnquist Court
Taxing and Spending Clause case law
United States Twenty-first Amendment case law
1987 in United States case law
Dole
Dole
Dole
Dole
Dole
Alcohol law in the United States
Legal drinking age